Willem "Wim" Aantjes (16 January 1923 – 22 October 2015) was a Dutch politician of the Christian Democratic Appeal (CDA).

Aantjes a jurist by occupation, was elected as a Member of the House of Representatives on 26 May 1959 after the general election of 1959. He served as the Parliamentary leader of the Anti-Revolutionary Party in the House of Representatives from 22 June 1971 until 30 November 1972, during the period when Barend Biesheuvel the Leader of the Anti-Revolutionary Party served as Prime Minister of the Netherlands. Aantjes became Leader of the Anti-Revolutionary Party and Parliamentary leader on 7 March 1973 and served until 25 May 1977 when the became the Parliamentary leader of the Christian Democratic Appeal in the House of Representatives of the Netherlands from 19 December 1977 until 7 November 1978 when he resigned both his positions.

Biography

Early life
Willem Aantjes was born on 16 January 1923 in Bleskensgraaf in the Netherlands Province of South Holland. His father, Klaas Aantjes', was alderman in Bleskensgraaf and from 1 October 1950 to 14 January 1951 mayor of Hendrik-Ido-Ambacht. His brother Jan Aantjes was also mayor of several municipalities. Aantjes attended the Marnix Gymnasium in Rotterdam.

On 8 February 1940, Aantjes started to work for the postal mail company PTT. On 19 July 1943, he was selected for Arbeitseinsatz and sent to Güstrow to deliver mail. Aantjes would later say he had not refused selection, because the board of PTT would otherwise have sent a married employee in his place. In September 1944, Aantjes wanted to return to the Netherlands. Other Dutch forced laborers told him that if one joined the Germanic SS, one could ask for an assignment in the Netherlands and be trained as a police officer on the Avegoor estate near Ellecom. Aantjes decided he would follow this route, and enlisted in the Germanic SS. To his dismay, he was assigned to Landstorm Nederland, a division of the Waffen-SS and he received a uniform. After being transferred to Hoogeveen, Aantjes refused to wear the uniform and to enlist in Landstorm Nederland. He was arrested and imprisoned in Port Natal near Assen, an abandoned psychiatric hospital that had been turned into a work camp by the Nazis.

After the war ended in May 1945, Aantjes enrolled at the University of Utrecht to study law. He never mentioned his enlisting in the Germaanse-SS to anyone.

Politics

Aantjes became a member of the House of Representatives for the Anti-Revolutionary Party (ARP) in 1959. He was offered the Ministry of Housing, Spatial Planning and the Environment in 1967. He turned it down, because several party members knew enough about his war past to object to his candidacy in public. On 6 July 1971, Aantjes became leader of the ARP group.

Aantjes played an important part in the merger of the Anti-Revolutionary Party (ARP), the Christian Historical Union (CHU) and the Catholic People's Party (KVP) into the Christian Democratic Appeal (CDA). His address to the first joint congress of the three parties, which was held in 1975, has become known as the "Sermon on the Mount". After the general election of 1977, Aantjes was offered the Ministry of Justice in the first cabinet of Prime Minister Dries van Agt. Again, Aantjes refused, and used his continuing involvement in the development of the CDA party as reason for his refusal. He then became the first leader of the CDA party in the House of Representatives on 20 December 1977.

World War II controversy and resignation
In 1978, Loe de Jong of the Dutch Institute for War Documentation was confronted with stories about Aantjes's alleged sympathies for Nazism. Although the Institute usually did not respond to such rumors, De Jong - considering the high position of Aantjes - believed that further investigation was necessary. His staff discovered a note, which showed that Aantjes was mobilized in October 1944 as part of the Waffen-SS. On 6 November 1978, De Jong announced in a press conference that Aantjes had signed up for the Waffen-SS in World War II, and that he had been a camp guard in Port Natal. Aantjes, at that time leader of the CDA party in the House of Representatives, resigned his position as parliamentary party leader and member of the House of Representatives the next day. Aantjes argued he had joined the Germanic SS because he believed that this was the only legal way to escape from forced labor in Güstrow. While De Jong assumed that Aantjes had joined the Germanic SS out of mere opportunism or sympathy for the Nazi ideology or the Dutch collaborating fascist National Socialist Movement in the Netherlands, Aantjes said this was not the case.

A later investigation showed that Aantjes was right and had instead been interned at Port Natal, and De Jong admitted to have made mistakes. The affair was publicly seen as a way for Aantjes' political rivals to get rid of him.

Decorations

References

External links

Official
  Mr. W. (Wim) Aantjes Parlement & Politiek

 

 

 

1923 births
2015 deaths
20th-century Dutch politicians
Anti-Revolutionary Party politicians
Christian Democratic Appeal politicians
Dutch collaborators with Nazi Germany
Dutch nonprofit directors
Dutch trade unionists
Dutch World War II forced labourers
Knights of the Order of the Netherlands Lion
Mail carriers
Members of the House of Representatives (Netherlands)
Leaders of the Anti-Revolutionary Party
People from Graafstroom
Politicians from Utrecht (city)
Political scandals in the Netherlands
Protestant Church Christians from the Netherlands
Reformed Churches Christians from the Netherlands
Utrecht University alumni